The 83rd edition of the KNVB Cup (at the time called Amstel Cup) started on August 8, 2000. The final was played on May 24, 2001: FC Twente beat PSV on penalties (4–3), after no goals were made during official and extra time. FC Twente won the cup for the second time. A total of 86 clubs participated.

Teams
 All 18 participants of the Eredivisie 2000-01: six teams entered in the round of 16 of the knock-out stage; one team in the first round of the knock-out stage and the rest in the group stage
 All 18 participants of the Eerste Divisie 2000-01
 48 teams from lower (amateur) leagues
 Two youth teams

Group stage
The matches of the group stage were played between August 8 and September 13, 2000. 79 teams participated and 117 matches were played. 39 teams advanced to the next round.

E Eredivisie; 1 Eerste Divisie; A Amateur teams

Knock-out Stage

First round
The matches of the first round were played on September 20 and 21, 2000. RKC Waalwijk entered the tournament here, during the group stage they were still active in the Intertoto Cup.

E one Eredivisie entrant

Second round
The matches of the second round were played between October 19, 2000 and January 23, 2001.

Round of 16
The matches were played between January 24 and 27, 2001. The six Eredivisie teams that had been playing in European competitions after qualification last season, entered the tournament this round.

E six Eredivisie entrants

Quarter-finals
The first three matches were played on 7 February 2001. The fourth was played on 14 March.

Semi-finals
The matches of the semi-finals were played on April 11 and 12, 2001.

Final

FC Twente would participate in the UEFA Cup.

See also
Eredivisie 2000-01
Eerste Divisie 2000-01

External links
 Results by Ronald Zwiers  

2000-01
2000–01 domestic association football cups
2000–01 in Dutch football